The Little Red Schoolhouse is a former school building located in Scottsdale, Arizona. It was originally known as the Scottsdale Grammar School and is now home to the Scottsdale Historical Museum.

The Little Red Schoolhouse was built in 1909 to replace an earlier one-room frame schoolhouse that was built in 1896. The new schoolhouse is a two-classroom structure built of red brick at a cost of $4,500. In addition to the two large classrooms, there is an entrance hall, two small rooms for storage, and a full-sized basement that was used as a church and a community center in the early years. The schoolhouse was later used as the Scottsdale City Hall and Justice Court, the Scottsdale Public Library and then the Scottsdale Chamber of Commerce.

The Scottsdale Historical Society was established in 1969 to save the Little Red Schoolhouse from being demolished for the development of the Scottsdale Mall. Over the next several years, the school was restored to its original condition and now includes a classroom exhibit meant to appear as it did in 1910. In November 1991, the Scottsdale Historical Society opened the building to the public as a local history museum and in 1994 it was added to the National Register of Historic Places.

See also

 Little Red Schoolhouse (Beyerville, Arizona)
 National Register of Historic Places listings in Maricopa County, Arizona

References

School buildings completed in 1909
1909 establishments in Arizona Territory
Former school buildings in the United States
Buildings and structures in Scottsdale, Arizona
School buildings on the National Register of Historic Places in Arizona
Defunct schools in Arizona
History museums in Arizona
Schoolhouses in Arizona
Museums in Scottsdale, Arizona
National Register of Historic Places in Maricopa County, Arizona